DC Rebirth is a 2016 relaunch by the American comic book publisher DC Comics of its entire line of ongoing monthly superhero comic book titles. Using the end of The New 52 initiative in May 2016 as its launching point, DC Rebirth restored the DC Universe to a form much like that prior to the 2011 "Flashpoint" storyline while still incorporating numerous elements of The New 52, including its continuity.

DC Comics ended the Rebirth branding in December 2017, opting to include everything under a larger "DC Universe" banner and naming. The continuity and repercussions established by Rebirth continues into the New Justice (2018–2021), Infinite Frontier (2021–2023), and Dawn of DC (2023) relaunches.

Publication history

DC Universe: Rebirth Special and initiative launch
In January 2016, DC Comics co-publishers Dan DiDio and Jim Lee tweeted an image of a blue curtain with the word "Rebirth" on it, teasing the event's release. The following month, DC announced its Rebirth initiative, a line-wide relaunch of its titles, to begin in June 2016. Beginning with an 80-page one-shot which was released on May 25, 2016, Rebirth returned Action Comics and Detective Comics to their previous numbering (#957 and #934, respectively).
 

Geoff Johns, president and CCO of DC Entertainment, described the 80-page one-shot as "re-laying the groundwork for DC's future while celebrating the past and present. It's not about throwing anything away. It's quite the opposite." On the initiative, which was described as a rebirth of the DC Universe, Johns called Rebirth more "in the same vein as Green Lantern: Rebirth and The Flash: Rebirth. Some things alter and change, but it's more character-driven, and it's also more about revealing secrets and mysteries within the DC Universe about "Flashpoint" and The New 52 that are part of a bigger tapestry." The Rebirth initiative would reintroduce concepts from pre-"Flashpoint" continuity that The New 52 had done away with, and build "on everything that's been published since Action Comics #1 up thru The New 52." Lee said that Johns "came up with this brilliant story [for the DC Universe: Rebirth Special] that basically allows us to seat the New 52 within the continuity that preceded it. So it really synchronizes and harmonizes pre-52 with New 52 continuity".

Creative teams for the Rebirth titles, along with some art and storylines, were revealed at WonderCon 2016. Johns worked with each writing team and the editors for the titles to help refocus "on these characters, deconstructing them down to their core DNA and building out story arcs based on that DNA". Additionally, two titles part of the initial announcement in February, Gotham Academy: Second Semester and Earth 2, were revealed to no longer be considered Rebirth titles, instead acting as continuations of their New 52 titles, Gotham Academy and Earth 2: Society, respectively. Regarding the decision to focus on fewer titles, with some shipping twice-monthly, DiDio said, "What we did was eliminate some of the lower ranked titles, and we're trying to incorporate those ideas into the main books themselves, because we feel that makes the main books stronger" adding, "we look at things like... Gotham by Midnight. And I loved Gotham by Midnight, but it never got the sampling that a Batman book would. But if we did that Gotham by Midnight story and integrated it into the Batman series that was shipping twice monthly, there was a better chance for people to see those characters, get excited by those characters, and more importantly, if we ever decided to thin them out, maybe we'd have a stronger audience and a better chance for series like that to succeed." DiDio also revealed that DC had breaks in the schedule "where we'll decide whether or not a double-ship is working" and potentially change it to monthly status. "We're going to be examining that on a regular basis," he added. "We're not going to keep book double-shipping if we don't think the demand is there."

Regarding the release of variant covers for titles, Lee said, "we're only using specialty variants with comic book shops and variant covers in judicious ways. We're not going to have a gazillion SKUs across the entire line. We find that, at that point, why publish a story inside at all, if you're just going to build a business based on variant covers. We're still using variant covers, but we're actually using one variant cover artist for each book. They sort of get tenure, as it were. And they're going to be responsible for being the alternate cover artist on that book. And we're only doing it on our top-selling books."

On May 27, 2016, DC announced that DC Universe: Rebirth Special #1 would receive a second printing. Additionally, the first wave of Rebirth one-shots – Superman: Rebirth, Batman: Rebirth, Green Lanterns: Rebirth and Green Arrow: Rebirth – also received second printings, with a recolored Rebirth banner to differentiate it from the original printing. A fourth printing featured a cover by Ethan Van Sciver depicting the scene where Wally West interrupts Batman in the Batcave, with the image of three Jokers on the Batcomputer. DC Universe: Rebirth Specials fifth printing, announced in August 2016, featured a new cover by Phil Jimenez that depicts Barry Allen and Wally West grabbing each other's hands.

Second phase, price increase, and the end of Rebirth
In September 2016, DC announced the Justice League vs. Suicide Squad miniseries for release in December 2016 through January 2017, which would "reintroduce a supervillain that hasn't been seen for some time." Johns called the story in the miniseries "another building block to 'Rebirth’" that would "set the stage for ‘Rebirth’ Phase 2" with the reemergence of "a surprising team... and another piece of the puzzle of the future of the DC Universe, and the past, [coming] into focus." The second phase of Rebirth began in February 2017, with the launch of Justice League of America, Super Sons, and Batwoman. In January 2017, DC announced the four-issue storyline "The Button" for release in April and May 2017. Taking place in issues 21 and 22 of Batman and The Flash, the storyline continues plot elements from the DC Universe: Rebirth Special with Batman and Barry Allen investigating the mystery of the Comedian's smiley face button found in the Batcave. To account for the price increase, each physical copy came with a code to redeem a free digital copy of the title. DC also indicated that the semi-monthly titles would stay at the  price point.

In May 2017, DC announced the miniseries Doomsday Clock for release in November 2017. Written by Johns with art by Frank, it continues the story presented in the DC Universe: Rebirth Special and "The Button" storyline focusing on Superman and Doctor Manhattan. Speaking on the project, Johns said, "It is Watchmen colliding with the DC Universe. It is the most personal and most epic, utterly mind-bending project I have ever worked on in my career. With Rebirth, I opened the door to Manhattan. Part of that was I loved the real-world influence Watchmen has. I put Manhattan out there, and always thought there was a Manhattan/Superman story to be told... at the core of it, there’s a being who has lost his humanity and distanced himself from it, and an alien who embodies humanity more than most humans. I love the idea that Watchmen influenced DC, but what would that look like in reverse? And it goes well beyond that." Johns indicated the miniseries would not be a sequel to Watchmen and would be a stand-alone story, with no tie-in material. Despite this, Johns noted Doomsday Clock " have an impact on the entire DC Universe. It will affect everything moving forward and everything that has come before. It will touch the thematic and literal essence of DC." Johns also noted that the miniseries would be set one year in the future of the DC Universe, so by the time the final issue releases, "the rest of the universe will have caught up to it — and the repercussions of the event will become known."

In October 2017, DC revealed that they would be discontinuing the Rebirth branding and logo from their titles in December 2017, releasing everything under a single umbrella title as the "DC Universe". Coincided with the release of the New Age of Heroes imprint, DiDio explained, "We want to make it clear that this is all the DC Universe... Rebirth pretty much  the DCU now; while we're taking Rebirth off the books, we'll be following the direction that Rebirth established." Titles also received new trade dresses, with those "that tie in clearly to our larger DC Universe" having a "DCU logo on them" in addition to corner boxes with icons of the characters to help identify the family of titles; titles outside the DCU, such as Injustice 2 and DC Bombshells would simply have the DC logo on them. DC planned to continue their dual cover release of titles as they have "seen a genuine interest in them, as they're well accepted by both fans and retailers".

Changes for the DC Universe
With the release of DC Universe: Rebirth Special, characters not seen during the New 52 line of DC Comics comic books, such as the first version of the character Wally West, Jackson Hyde and Ryan Choi, reappeared in the DC Comics line of comic books, while other characters, such as Ted Kord and Ray Palmer, were revised to be similar to their characters as they appeared prior to the "Flashpoint" storyline. Within the story, Wally states to Barry Allen that the cause of the alterations to "history" following the end of "Flashpoint" was an outside force (revealed to be Doctor Manhattan from the Watchmen universe) removing 10 years of history from the internal timeline of the comic books' stories (resulting in the younger age of heroes in the "New 52" storyline, the resurrections of several deceased characters, and the loss of legacy and previous relationships) rather than Barry's merging of several alternate timelines, as was previously presented in the "Flashpoint" story.

Nearly all characters had their designs revised. Some of those who are also featured in the DC Extended Universe (WarnerMedia's film franchise based on DC Comics characters) now more closely resemble their on-screen counterparts, such as Harley Quinn and Wonder Woman.

Another new character is the enigmatic "Mr. Oz", who is watching Earth, kidnapping characters such as Mister Mxyzptlk, Doomsday and Tim Drake, as he hinted they would play very important roles in the future, and insisted they must remain "off the field".

At the end of the "Superman Reborn" event in April 2017, a story in the comic book Action Comics presents Superman, alongside his wife Lois Lane and their son Jonathan Samuel Kent, merging the "timelines" of the DC Comics superhero line from before and after the "Flashpoint" event into a single fictional reality, resulting in further change to the internal timeline of the fictional world of DC Comics superheroes. Peter J. Tomasi said that "The events of Action #976 reset and reshape the entire Superman timeline. Where there had been two Superman, their realities have now been fused into one timeline with just one of them."

DC Comics representatives stated that the books will deal with the aftermath of Doctor Manhattan's actions by the end of the Doomsday Clock miniseries.

Titles

Ongoing series
At WonderCon 2016, DC revealed the initial titles under four different "families", grouping similar characters or titles together.

Batman

These titles feature Batman and the "Batman Family" of characters.

Superman/Wonder Woman
These titles feature Superman, the "Superman Family" of characters and Wonder Woman.

Justice League
These titles feature characters related to the Justice League, as well as the Green Lantern Corps and the Teen Titans.

Other
These titles do not fall under the larger headings above, or were not announced with those titles.

One-shots

A Rebirth issue for Trinity was also planned for release in August 2016, written by Francis Manapul with art by Manapul and Clay Mann, but it was never released.

Miniseries

The six-issue miniseries Death of Hawkman, written by Marc Andreyko with art by Aaron Lopresti, does not feature the "Rebirth" banner on its cover, but is considered by Andreyko to be "'Rebirth' adjacent". Despite not having the "Rebirth" banner on its cover, the miniseries Mister Miracle was stated to be a part of the Rebirth continuity by writer Tom King.

Sales
By the end of August 2016, all Rebirth titles combined accounted for 12 million units shipped, with 11 issues exceeding 200,000 units shipped, over 60 issues exceeding 100,000 units shipped, and 21 issues having multiple printings.

Marketing
Beginning in January 2017, television commercials aired on AMC, IFC, TBS, TNT, truTV, El Rey Network and Boomerang through February 2017. The commercials promoted the release of the first wave of collected editions, highlighting Batman, The Flash, Green Arrow, Justice League, Suicide Squad, Supergirl, Superman, and Wonder Woman, with three additional commercials promoting Rebirth as a whole. Additionally, DC "is also offering [comic] retailers co-op funds to help pay for ads on local markets, promoting Rebirth with a space for a store tag at the end of the commercial." In February 2017, DC partnered once again with National CineMedia to promote its comics and partner comic shops with pre-movie advertisements. Having worked with National CineMedia for ads during The New 52, DC created 15 and 30 second ads for Rebirth "that comic shops can have their contact info added into," with DC "offering a 50% reimbursement on these ads should a retailer buy them with National CineMedia."

Collected editions

See also
 Infinite Frontier, the March 2021 relaunch of DC Comics that succeeded Rebirth

Notes
1. For additional creative team information, see each title's individual article.

References

Comic book reboots
DC Comics storylines